Dyscophus insularis is a species of frog in the family Microhylidae.
It is endemic to western Madagascar (the two other Dyscophus species are from eastern Madagascar).
Its natural habitats are subtropical or tropical dry forests, subtropical or tropical moist lowland forests, dry savanna, moist savanna, intermittent rivers, and intermittent freshwater marshes.
It is threatened by habitat loss.

References

Dyscophus
Endemic frogs of Madagascar
Taxa named by Alfred Grandidier
Taxonomy articles created by Polbot
Amphibians described in 1872